Anzor Magomedovich Daurbekov (born 1 December 1977) is a former Russian professional football player.

Club career
He played 4 seasons in the Russian Football National League for PFC Spartak Nalchik and FC Angusht Nazran.

References

External links
 

1977 births
Living people
Russian footballers
Association football forwards
Association football midfielders
PFC Spartak Nalchik players
FC Angusht Nazran players
FC Sheksna Cherepovets players